The Shire of Wyalkatchem is a local government area located in the Wheatbelt region of Western Australia.

History
On 18 June 1920, the Wyalkatchem Road District was created out of land previously administered by the Ninghan and Dowerin Road Boards. On 1 July 1961, it became the Shire of Wyalkatchem under the Local Government Act 1960, which reformed all remaining road districts into shires.

Wards
The shire has no wards, and seven councillors. The shire president is elected from amongst the councillors.

Towns and localities
The towns and localities of the Shire of Wyalkatchem with population and size figures based on the most recent Australian census:

Population

Heritage-listed places

As of 2023, 133 places are heritage-listed in the Shire of Wyalkatchem, of which ten are on the State Register of Heritage Places.

References

External links

 

Wyalkatchem